Mirificarma montivaga is a moth of the family Gelechiidae. It is found in Morocco and Algeria. Adults are on wing from May to July.

References

Moths described in 1904
Mirificarma
Moths of Africa